L5 was a French girl group. They were known for their participation in the French Popstars TV programme in its first season in  2001.

L5 reached the 54th position in the list of French best-selling singles and held the number 1 position in the list of French number-one hits of 2001 with their song "Toutes les femmes de ta vie". They toured in France with Jérémy Chatelain in 2003 and with Billy Crawford in 2006. "Make a Change", on the album Destiny by No Angels, is an English-language remake of L5's single "Reste Encore" (2003).

Since 2017, they have been heavily copied by a group of French gay twitter semi-celebrities calling themselves the #ils5: Chaudlaine, Alexandre Zakine, Maxime Lemoine, Maxime Lemoine and Alexis Filouterie.

Members
Alexandra Canto (Alex Dana), born on 26 June 1978 in Marseille
Claire Litvine (Claire L.), born on 4 April 1972 in Pau
Coralie Gelle (Coraly Emoi), born on 7 October 1977 in Bressuire
Louisy Joseph, born on 14 April 1978 in Lyon
Marjorie Parascandola (Margie Nelson), born on 8 October 1980 in Pierrelatte

Discography

Albums

Singles

DVDs
2002 - Comment Devenir Popstars (L'historie Vraie du Groupe)
2004 – Le Live

References

French pop music groups
French girl groups